The MetaBrainz Foundation is a 501(c)(3) tax-exempt non-profit based in San Luis Obispo, California that operates the MusicBrainz project and several other related projects.

With the creation of the MetaBrainz Foundation on 19 April 2005, the MusicBrainz project entered its second phase of life. In the first incarnation, the project had been privately maintained and focused primarily on collecting basic music metadata. The MusicBrainz project has grown considerably since then, using the legal backing and infrastructure of the MetaBrainz Foundation to continue to thrive and expand its scope.

References

External links

This article contains text from the MetaBrainz website, which is licensed under the GPL.

Arts foundations based in the United States
Mass media companies of the United States
Companies established in 2004
Companies based in California
Non-profit organizations based in California
MusicBrainz